Richard Green Moulton (5 May 1849 – 15 August 1924) was an English professor, author, and lawyer.

Biography
Richard Green Moulton was born in England in 1849. He was the brother of William Fiddian Moulton, John Fletcher Moulton, and  James Egan Moulton.

He received degrees from the University of London, University of Cambridge, and University of Pennsylvania. After teaching at Cambridge, the American Society Extension University, and the London Society for the Extension of University Education, he became a professor of English literature at the University of Chicago in 1892.

He died at his home in Tunbridge Wells on 15 August 1924.

Selected publications
 Shakespeare as a dramatic artist; a popular illustration of the principles of scientific criticism. (1885) Oxford, Clarendon Press.
 The ancient classical drama; a study in literary evolution intended for readers in English and in the original. (1890). Oxford, The Clarendon Press.
 The literary study of the Bible. An account of the leading forms of literature represented in the sacred writings. (1896). London, Isbister & Co.
 Select masterpieces of Biblical literature. (1901). New York, The Macmillan company; London, Macmillan & co., ltd.
 A short introduction to the literature of the Bible. (1901). Boston, D. C. Heath & Co. 
 The Modern Reader's Bible Translation (1907). New York, The Macmillan Company. 
 The Bible at a single view. (1918). With an appendix, how to read the Bible. New York, The Macmillan company.

References

External links
 
 

1849 births
1924 deaths
English lawyers
Richard Green
English emigrants to the United States
19th-century English writers
Alumni of the University of Cambridge
Alumni of the University of London
University of Chicago faculty
University of Pennsylvania alumni